Jabbarkhel or JabarKhil, sometimes spelled JabarKhel or JabarKhyl, Jabarkhail are a leading landowning clan of the Ahmadzai tribe of Pashtun people and consist of more than fifteen thousand families. Many of the families carry the surname "Jabbar Khel" but some have changed their surnames to the names of their Fathers or Grandfathers.    The tribe is believed to have descended from an Ahmadzai leader named Jabbar. They are believed to have been located primarily in the region of Qabr-i-Jabbar/Khaki Jabbar District.
Abdul Rahim Arsala was the son of the leader and descended from that tribe. He was later called on by the king, among the other tribe members to be members of the military.

References

Ghilji Pashtun tribes